Stunt Pilot is a 1939 American adventure film directed by George Waggner and written by Scott Darling and George Waggner. The film is based on the comic strip Tailspin Tommy by Hal Forrest and Glenn Chaffin. Stunt Pilot stars John Trent, Marjorie Reynolds, Milburn Stone, Jason Robards Sr., Pat O'Malley and George Meeker. Following the success of Mystery Plane (1939), Stunt Pilot, the second in the "Tailspin Tommy" series, was released on July 2, 1939, by Monogram Pictures.

Plot
While  working as a stunt pilot for Hollywood director Sheehan, Tailspin Tommy suspects that his aircraft was sabotaged to get authentic crash footage. He quits his job, and Earl Martin, a reckless pilot, replaces Tommy.

After Martin crashes his aircraft while flying with Tommy's sweetheart, Betty Lou Barnes, Tommy becomes enraged. Sheehan, needing a pilot to perform a dangerous dogfight with Martin, convinces Tommy's pal Skeeter to take the job. Skeeter is desperate to raise money to pay for his sister's operation.

Tommy, afraid for his friend's life, kidnaps Skeeter and flies in his place. During the dog fight, Tommy's machine gun is loaded with real bullets, and he shoots down Martin before realizing his gun is not shooting blanks. He is arrested on the charge of murder. Tommy remembers an argument he overheard between Martin and Sheehan, and is sure that the director is behind the murder. He takes off after Sheehan's train.

Meanwhile, the sheriff is after Tommy, until Skeeter finds photographs that show Sheehan replacing the bullets in Tommy's machine gun. Sheehan's train is stopped and the sheriff obtains Sheehan's confession that he killed Martin because the pilot had stolen the affections of his wife and then deserted her.

Cast    
      
 John Trent as Tailspin Tommy Tompkins
 Marjorie Reynolds as Betty Lou Barnes
 Milburn Stone as "Skeeter" Milligan
 Jason Robards Sr. as Paul Smith
 Pat O'Malley as Sheehan
 George Meeker as Earl Martin
 Wesley Barry as Glenn
 George Cleveland as Sheriff
 John Daheim as Tex 
 Tod Sterling as Charlie
 Mary Field as Ethel 
  Buddy Cox as Bobby
 Forrest Taylor as Doctor
 David Newell as Radio Operator
 Carleton Young as Reporter Trent
 Ray Turner as The Porter
 Jack Kirk as Crewman

Production
Monogram Pictures, with the assistance of Paul Mantz, lined up an impressive number of aircraft to be used in Stunt Pilot: 
 SPAD XIII c/n S-248, NX18968
 Fokker D.VII c/n 504/17, N6268 
 Garland-Lincoln LF-1
 Nieuport Ni.28 N10415 and N8539 
 Waco CTO
 Royal Aircraft Factory S.E.5 c/n AS-22-296
 Ryan STA c/n 128, NC16037
 Stearman C3R c/n 5013, NC670K
 Travel Air 2000 c/n 257, NC3557 
 Douglas DC-3

Principal photography on Stunt Pilot, with stunt flying by Wally West, began on May 20, 1939 at the Metropolitan Airport, Los Angeles. Additional stock footage was obtained from Hell's Angels (1930).

Reception
Aviation film historian Michael Paris in From the Wright Brothers to Top Gun: Aviation, Nationalism, and Popular Cinema recognized many "film within a film" elements in Stunt Pilot that would later appear in modern classics such as The Great Waldo Pepper (1975).

References

Notes

Citations

Bibliography

 Farmer, James H. Celluloid Wings: The Impact of Movies on Aviation. Blue Ridge Summit, Pennsylvania: Tab Books Inc., 1984. .
 Paris, Michael. From the Wright Brothers to Top Gun: Aviation, Nationalism, and Popular Cinema. Manchester, UK: Manchester University Press, 1995. .
 Pendo, Stephen. Aviation in the Cinema. Lanham, Maryland: Scarecrow Press, 1985. .
 Wynne, H. Hugh. The Motion Picture Stunt Pilots and Hollywood's Classic Aviation Movies. Missoula, Montana: Pictorial Histories Publishing Co., 1987. .

External links
 
 

1939 films
1939 adventure films
American adventure films
American aviation films
American black-and-white films
Films about stunt performers
Films directed by George Waggner
Monogram Pictures films
1930s English-language films
1930s American films
English-language adventure films